Aethalochroa ashmoliana, common name Iranian stick mantis, is a species of praying mantis found in India, Iran, Pakistan, and Sri Lanka.

See also
List of mantis genera and species
Stick Mantis

References

Aethalochroa
Insects of Asia
Insects of India
Fauna of Iran
Fauna of Pakistan
Insects of Sri Lanka
Insects described in 1841